Ili-Ishar, also Ilum-Ishar (Il3-Ishar), was a ruler of the city of Mari, northern Mesopotamia, after the fall of the Akkadian Empire c. 2084-2072 BCE. His father was Apil-Kin, and his brother was Tura-Dagan, who succeeded him. 

He held the title of Shakkanakku (military governor), which was borne by all the princes of a dynasty who reigned at Mari in the late third millennium and early second millennium BC. These kings were the descendants of the military governors appointed by the kings of Akkad. He was contemporary of the Third Dynasty of Ur, and probably their vassal.

Several brick inscriptions in the name of Ili-Ishar have been found in Mari, describing the building of a canal:

On some of his inscriptions, Ili-Ishar uses the title dannum''' ("the Great") in front of his function Shakkanakku'' ("Military Governor"), a practice which is first attested at Mari from the inscriptions of Apil-Kin, and was initially introduced by Naram-Sin of the Akkadian Empire.

References

21st-century BC rulers
Kings of Mari
21st-century BC people